The Mandarin's House is a historic residential complex in São Lourenço, Macau. It was the residence and family home of the late Qing theoretician and reformist Zheng Guanying (1842–1921). He completed his masterpiece Shengshi Weiyan (Words of Warning in Times of Prosperity) in the house.

History
The Mandarin's House was built in 1869 (eighth year of the reign of the Tongzhi Emperor) by Zheng Guanyin's father Zheng Wenrui. Zheng Guanying and his brothers gradually enlarged the complex since. It was built largely in Cantonese style but is noted for its fusion of western architectural elements.

In 1990s, the Zheng family gradually moved out and the house was then rented out. There were at once more than 300 tenants living inside the complex, resulting in poor living conditions.

The house was 4,000 square meters. The house was badly damaged because of a fire, and it took eight years to fix the house.

The government overtook the complex in 2001. In 2005, the house was listed as part of the Historic Centre of Macau, a UNESCO World Heritage Site.

See also
 List of oldest buildings and structures in Macau

References

External links

 Webpage at wh.mo
 Article by  Mark O'Neill publsihed in the Macao Magazine on 28 October 2021

Historic Centre of Macau
Buildings and structures in Macau
Macau Peninsula